The 2020 Greater Hyderabad Municipal Corporation election was conducted on 1 December 2020 to elect members to all 150 wards of the municipal corporation. The BJP made significant inroads into the GHMC, much at the loss of the TRS. After the results were declared, the TRS formed the government with outside support from the AIMIM.

Election schedule

Polls

Exit polls

Results By Ward
The results were announced on 5 December 2020, The Telangana Rashtra Samithi has won 56 wards while Bharatiya Janata Party and All India Majlis-e-Ittehadul Muslimeen have won 48 and 44 wards respectively. The winners are as follows.

References

External links
 TSEC elections results

Greater Hyderabad Municipal Corporation
2020 elections in India
Hyderabad
Local elections in Telangana